Alexander Paulsen  (born 4 July 2002) is a New Zealand footballer who plays as a goalkeeper for Wellington Phoenix. He was educated at Selwyn College in Auckland and Scots College in Wellington. He was part of the New Zealand  team  in the football competition at the 2020 Summer Olympics.

Club career
He made his A-League debut on 19 December 2021, in a 2–1 loss against Sydney FC after coming on for an injured Oli Sail.

In an FFA Cup quarterfinal match against Melbourne City on 5 January 2022, Paulsen made three saves in a 0–0 (4–3) penalty shootout extra time win to secure the Phoenix's maiden semifinal appearance in the competition.

References

External links

Living people
2002 births
Wellington Phoenix FC players
New Zealand association footballers
Association football goalkeepers
Footballers at the 2020 Summer Olympics
Olympic association footballers of New Zealand